The 2015–16 Maltese FA Trophy was the 78th version of the knockout tournament. The competition started on 5 September 2015 and ended on 14 May 2016.

Birkirkara were the defending champions, but were eliminated in the semi-finals by Sliema Wanderers.

Format
This version of the Maltese FA Trophy was a single elimination tournament contested by 65 teams. The winner, Sliema Wanderers, earned a spot in the Europa League. Sliema were unable to obtain a UEFA license. As a result, the berth was given to the fourth-placed team of the Premier League. Matches which were level after regulation went to extra time and then penalties to determine a winner.

Schedule

Preliminary round
One preliminary match was played on 5 September 2015. The draw for the preliminary, first, and second rounds was held 18 August 2015.

|colspan="3" style="background:#fcc;"|5 September 2015

|}

First round
Twelve first round matches were played between 11–13 September 2015. The draw for the preliminary, first, and second rounds was held 18 August 2015.

|colspan="3" style="background:#fcc;"|11 September 2015

|-
|colspan="3" style="background:#fcc;"|12 September 2015

|-
|colspan="3" style="background:#fcc;"|13 September 2015

|}

Second round
Twenty second round matches were played between 23–25 October 2015. The draw for the preliminary, first, and second rounds was held 18 August 2015.

|colspan="3" style="background:#fcc;"|23 October 2015

|-
|colspan="3" style="background:#fcc;"|24 October 2015

|-
|colspan="3" style="background:#fcc;"|25 October 2015

|}

Third round
Sixteen third round matches were played between 1 December 2015 and 6 January 2016. The draws for the third and fourth round were held on 27 October 2015.

|colspan="3" style="background:#fcc;"|1 December 2015

|-
|colspan="3" style="background:#fcc;"|2 December 2015

|-
|colspan="3" style="background:#fcc;"|9 December 2015

|-
|colspan="3" style="background:#fcc;"|15 December 2015

|-
|colspan="3" style="background:#fcc;"|16 December 2015

|-
|colspan="3" style="background:#fcc;"|6 January 2016

|}

Fourth round
Eight fourth round matches were played between 19–20 January 2016. The draws for the third and fourth round were held on 27 October 2015.

|colspan="3" style="background:#fcc;"|19 January 2016

|-
|colspan="3" style="background:#fcc;"|20 January 2016

|}

Quarter-finals
Four quarter-final matches were played 19–20 April 2016. The draw for the quarter-final was held on 3 February 2016.

|colspan="3" style="background:#fcc;"|19 April 2016

|-
|colspan="3" style="background:#fcc;"|20 April 2016

|}

Semi-finals
Two semi-final matches were played 7–8 May 2016. The draw for the semi-final was held on 27 April 2016.

Final
The final was played 14 May 2016.

See also
2015–16 Maltese Premier League

External links
maltafootball.com
soccerway.com
uefa.com

References

Malta
Maltese FA Trophy seasons
Cup